Mannington Historic District is a historic district located at Mannington, West Virginia, United States, that is listed on the National Register of Historic Places.

Description
The district includes 207 contributing buildings in Mannington's central business district and surrounding residential areas. Notable buildings include the railroad depot (c. 1896), Exchange Bank Building (c. 1897), U.S. Post Office (c. 1938), Colonial Building (c. 1904), the Blackshere House (c. 1900), the Bartlett House (c. 1900), First National Bank Building (c. 1909), the Furbee Building (c. 1900), the Hammond House (c. 1855), the Modi Building (1917), and the Mannington District Public High School (1925).  The contributing buildings are representative of popular late-19th- and early 20th-century architectural styles.

It was listed on the National Register of Historic Places November 22, 1995.

See also

 National Register of Historic Places listings in Marion County, West Virginia

References

External links

 Mannington Main Street website

Historic districts in Marion County, West Virginia
Colonial Revival architecture in West Virginia
Georgian Revival architecture in West Virginia
Victorian architecture in West Virginia
Buildings and structures in Marion County, West Virginia
National Register of Historic Places in Marion County, West Virginia
Commercial buildings on the National Register of Historic Places in West Virginia
Historic districts on the National Register of Historic Places in West Virginia